Mana is a village in the district of Chamoli in the Indian state of Uttarakhand, located at an altitude of 3,200 meters. It is located on the northern  terminus of National Highway 7 (new numbering system), Mana is the last village before the Mana Pass and is 26 kilometres from the border of India and Tibet The village is at a distance of about 3 km from the Hindu Pilgrimage Badrinath and the two places are culturally connected with each other.

Demography
As per Census 2011 the village had about 558 households and a population of about 1214. The people belong to Marchhas and Jads or Bhotias. During winter months, the entire populations comes down to lower places, as the area is covered under snow. Many coffee shops here tell people that their shop is the last coffee shop on the Indian border.

Cultural identity
The villagers of this village are culturally associated with activities of Badrinath temple and annual fair of Matha murthi. They used to trade with Tibet in earlier days.  There is a small cave in Mana, named Vyas Gufa and it is believed that Maharshi Vyas composed Mahabharatha in this cave. One more cave is called Ganesh Gufa and tourists visit both caves regularly.

Other destinations
Nearby places include Vasudhara Falls, Satopanth Lake, Bhim Pul, Saraswati Temple etc.

See also
Niti Valley

References 

Tourism in Uttarakhand
Cities and towns in Chamoli district